Discosia is a genus of plant pathogens in the family Sporocadaceae.

It was published by Marie-Anne Libert in 1837.

The genus was re-studied by Subramanian and Reddy (1974), who designated Discosia strobilina  as lectotype for the genus (Nag Raj 1993; Tanaka et al. 2011). Later, when Sphaeria artocreas  was transferred to the genus and combined under Discosia artocreas , the latter was chosen as lectotype of the genus (Fries 1849; Vanev 1991).

Vanev (1991, 1992a, b, c, d) made a detailed taxonomic revision of the genus. On the basis of the location of the conidial septa and appendages, he delimited six sections (Vanev 1991), and to clarify the status of the genus he designated its lectotype as Discosia artocreas  (Vanev 1992a).

In 2015, Senanayake, Indunil C.; Maharachchikumbura, Sajeewa S. N. et al. (2015) moved the genus to its own family Discosiaceae . But in 2016, it was moved back into the family Sporocadaceae.

Species of Discosia are mostly saprobes (processing of decayed (dead or waste) organic matter) or parasites of vascular plants, and have been recorded worldwide from terrestrial habitats on a various range of host plants (Farr & Rossman 2019). Based on phylogenetic evidence, Liu et al. (2019a) synonymised Adiscio under Discosia, Adiscio which was originally introduced by Tanaka et al. (2011), to accommodate the sexual morph species of this genus. An epitype for the type species of Discosia was designated by Liu et al. (2019a) as the type specimen was destroyed.

Hosts
Discosia rhododendricola sp.nov, Neopestalotiopsis rhododendricola sp.nov and Diaporthe nobilis were new asexual fungal species found in 2022 on Rhododendron spp. in Kunming, Yunnan Province in China. Discosia strobilina has been found on various rhododendron species (including Rhododendron arboreum and Rhododendron campulatum) as leaf spots on dead and living leaves in Mexico, Europe, India and Japan. Discosia vagans was found on fallen leaves and dead stems on various rhododendron species in Italy and India.
In Poland species of Discosia were found on 12 host plants including Anemone nemorosa , Galium odoratum , Gymnocarpium dryopteris , Moehringia trinervia , Mycelis muralis , Oxalis acetosella , Tilia cordata  and Viola reichenbachiana  Discosia artocreas has been found in America on Cercis canadensis, Magnolia glauca and Aralia spinosa. In Alabama, USA species Discosia artocreas was found on Prunus serotina and Acer rubrum.Discosia italica and Discosia fagi were found on the dead leaves of Fagus sylvatica in Italy.Discosia rubi has been trialled as treatment for human pathogen Cryptococcus neoformans.

Distribution
It is has a wide scattered cosmopolitan distribution, it is found in USA,Charles Theodore Mohr  Mexico, Europe, (including Italy, and Poland,) India, Japan, Thailand, China, and New Zealand.

Species
As accepted by Species Fungorum;Discosia alboferruginea Discosia aquatica Discosia artocreas Discosia arxii Discosia baarnensis Discosia biciliata Discosia bombycina Discosia brasiliensis Discosia caffra Discosia castaneae Discosia ceanothi Discosia celtidis Discosia eucalypticola Discosia fagi Discosia fici Discosia fraxinea Discosia himalayensis Discosia hiptages Discosia italica Discosia jambolanae Discosia jordanovii Discosia julia Discosia lauricola Discosia ludwigii Discosia macrozamiae Discosia maculiformis Discosia neofraxinea Discosia nobilis Discosia novae-zelandiae Discosia petrakii Discosia pini Discosia pleurochaeta Discosia poikilomera Discosia poonensis Discosia pseudoartocreas Discosia pseudoceanothi Discosia pseudopleurochaeta Discosia pyri Discosia querci Discosia ravennica Discosia rosae Discosia rubi Discosia sampaioi Discosia spegazzinii Discosia strobilina Discosia subramanianii Discosia syzygii Discosia tamarindi Discosia tenzingii Discosia tillandsiae Discosia tricellularis Discosia vagans Discosia yakushimensis 

Former species;
 D. alnea  = Asteroma alneum, Gnomoniaceae
 D. artocreas f. camphorae  = Discosia artocreas, 
 D. artocreas var. aceris  = Discosia artocreas), 
 D. artocreas var. betulae  = Discosia artocreas),
 D. artocreas var. brasiliensis  = Discosia brasiliensis,
 D. artocreas var. camphorae  = Discosia artocreas,
 D. artocreas var. carpini  = Discosia artocreas,
 D. artocreas var. coryli  = Discosia artocreas,
 D. artocreas var. fagi  = Discosia artocreas,
 D. artocreas var. juglandis  = Discosia artocreas,
 D. artocreas var. mespili  = Discosia artocreas,
 D. artocreas var. platani  = Discosia artocreas,
 D. artocreas var. populi  = Discosia artocreas,
 D. artocreas var. quercina  = Discosia artocreas,
 D. artocreas var. sibirica  = Discosia artocreas,
 D. artocreas var. tremulae  = Discosia artocreas,
 D. artocreas var. ulmi  = Discosia artocreas,
 D. clypeata  = Anthostomella clypeata, Xylariaceae
 D. clypeata f. rosae  = Anthostomella clypeata, Xylariaceae
 D. cynosbati  = Seimatosporium rosae, Sporocadaceae
 D. eucalypti  = Immersidiscosia eucalypti, Amphisphaeriaceae
 D. grammita  = Seimatosporium grammitum, Sporocadaceae
 D. ignobilis  = Seimatosporium ignobilis, Sporocadaceae
 D. impressa  = Diplocarpon impressum, Drepanopezizaceae
 D. minima  = Mycoleptodiscus minimus, Magnaporthaceae
 D. passerinii  = Seimatosporium tostum, Sporocadaceae
 D. punicae  = Monochaetia punicae'', Amphisphaeriaceae

References

Amphisphaeriales
Taxa described in 1837